The 22951 Bandra Terminus–Gandhidham Weekly Superfast Express is a Superfast train belonging to Indian Railways – Western Railway zone that runs between Bandra Terminus & Gandhidham Junction in India.

It operates as train number 22951 from Bandra Terminus to Gandhidham Junction and as train number 22952 in the reverse direction, serving the states of Maharashtra & Gujarat.

Coaches

22951 Bandra Terminus–Gandhidham Weekly Superfast Express presently has 2 AC 2 tier, 6 AC 3 tier, 1 Pantry Car, 8 Sleeper class, 3 General Unreserved & 2 End on Generators.

As is customary with most train services in India, coach composition may be amended at the discretion of Indian Railways depending on demand.

Service

22951 Bandra Terminus–Gandhidham Weekly Superfast Express covers the distance of 859 kilometres in 15 hours 35 mins (49.32 km/hr) & in 15 hours 35 mins as 22952 Gandhidham–Bandra Terminus Weekly Superfast Express (53.97 km/hr).

As the average speed of the train is below , as per Indian Railways rules, its fare excludes a Superfast surcharge.

Routeing

Rake sharing

The train shares its rake with 12937/12938 Garbha Express.

Traction

As Western Railway switched over to AC system in February 2012, it is hauled by a Indian locomotive class WAP-5/WAP-7 locomotive from the Vadodara shed until  after which a Vatva-based WDM-3A powers the train for the remainder of its journey until Gandhidham Junction.

Timings

22951 Bandra Terminus–Gandhidham Weekly Superfast Express leaves Bandra Terminus every Thursday at 14:50 hrs IST and reaches Gandhidham Junction at 05:55 hrs IST the next day.

22952 Gandhidham–Bandra Terminus Weekly Superfast Express leaves Gandhidham Junction every Thursday at 20:40 hrs IST and reaches Bandra Terminus at 11:50 hrs IST the next day.

See also

Dadar–Bhuj Superfast Express
Kutch Express
Sayajinagari Express
Bandra Terminus–Bhuj AC Superfast Express

References

External links

Transport in Mumbai
Transport in Gandhidham
Express trains in India
Rail transport in Gujarat
Rail transport in Maharashtra
Transport in Kutch district
Railway services introduced in 2012